Walson is both a surname and a given name. Notable people with the name include:

John Walson (1915–1993), American inventor
Walson Augustin (born 1988), Haitian footballer 
Walson Gardener (born 1932), American racing driver

See also
Watson (surname)